Ricardo Guillermo Abarca Lowman (born June 1, 1986) is a Mexican actor and singer.

Born to Ricardo Abarca Medina and Yasmine Cheyenne Lowman, Ricardo Abarca  began his career as a member of the teenage Mexican boy band M5 with whom he released five albums from 2002 through 2009. After a special appearance in the popular telenovela Rebelde, Abarca obtained his first character role in Amores de mercado.

Early years 
In 2002, Abarca suffered an accident when he exited a helicopter and waved good-bye to fans. Doctors spent 12 hours reattaching his fingers that had been cut off, thanks to fans who had voluntarily searched for and located them, throughout the field, where the accident had occurred.

Filmography

Film

Television

Awards and nominations

References

External links

1986 births
Living people
Mexican male telenovela actors
Male actors from Michoacán
Singers from Michoacán
People from Morelia
21st-century Mexican male actors
21st-century Mexican singers
21st-century Mexican male singers